The 1972 ABC Under-18 Championship was the second edition of the Asian Basketball Confederation (ABC)'s junior championship. The games were held at Manila, Philippines from December 10–December 20, 1972.

The  were able to retain the championship by sweeping all of their assignments, blasting , 95-62, in the final day.

Preliminary round

Final round

Classification 5th–7th

Championship

Final standing

Awards

References

FIBA Asia Under-18 Championship
1972 in Asian basketball
1972 in Philippine basketball
International basketball competitions hosted by the Philippines
December 1972 sports events in Asia